Crossin is a surname. Notable people with the surname include:

Carl Crossin (born 1953), Australian choral conductor, educator, and composer
Chink Crossin (1923–1981), American basketball player
Frank Crossin (1891–1965), American baseball player 
Trish Crossin (born 1956), Australian politician